The Samuel White House, at 315 N. 100 East in Beaver, Utah, was built in 1869.  It was listed on the National Register of Historic Places in 1983.

The original house was built in 1869-70 by Samuel Orson White and his three brothers.  A cross-wing addition was added over about four years starting in 1887. The house is considered significant as it retains the original one-story section of the house, which was one of the very early permanent homes in Beaver.

Samuel White was born in Nauvoo, Illinois in 1844. He married Ellen Gudgeon. White was a farmer and a firefighter. He reported that the materials for the house cost $86.

References

National Register of Historic Places in Beaver County, Utah
Houses completed in 1869